Bosnia and Herzegovina is a country in Southeastern Europe located on the Balkan Peninsula. Sarajevo is the capital and largest city. Bosnia faces the dual-problem of rebuilding a war-torn country and introducing transitional liberal market reforms to its formerly mixed economy. One legacy of the previous era is a strong industry; under former republic president Džemal Bijedić and SFRY President Josip Broz Tito, metal industries were promoted in the republic, resulting in the development of a large share of Yugoslavia's plants; S.R. Bosnia and Herzegovina had a very strong industrial export oriented economy in the 1970s and 1980s, with large scale exports worth millions of US$.

For further information on the types of business entities in this country and their abbreviations, see "Business entities in Bosnia and Herzegovina".

Notable firms 
This list includes notable companies with primary headquarters located in the country. The industry and sector follow the Industry Classification Benchmark taxonomy. Organizations which have ceased operations are included and noted as defunct.

References 

Bosnia and Herzegovina